Underground Atlanta is a hip hop compilation album performed by various artists. The double disc album was released on August 31, 2009, by Grind Time Official and SMC Recordings. The song "I'mma Fool wit It", by Killer Mike featuring Big Kuntry King, was released as a single.

Track listing

Charts

References

2009 compilation albums
Killer Mike albums
SMC Recordings albums
Albums produced by B.o.B
Hip hop compilation albums
Albums produced by Nard & B